Anthony "The Bullet" Bonsante (born October 28, 1970) is a professional boxer and competitor on reality TV show The Contender. He also works overnight as a supervisor at a distribution center.

Personal life
Bonsante is a father of two children.

Boxing career

On TV's "The Contender"
He was a contestant on reality TV show The Contender, shortly before which he fought future contestant Peter Manfredo and lost. That fight was Manfredo's first defence of the WBO and NABA Light Middleweight Titles. Bonsante had previously won a fight for the vacant IBU Super Middleweight Title.

On the show, he was placed on the West Coast team and fought Brent Cooper in the sixth First Round fight. He won in his characteristic aggressive style. However, he was meant to fight Jimmy Lange, and an argument ensued over his choosing not to do so - Ishe Smith in particular become infuriated at his conduct.  Tarick Salmaci was the only boxer to accept that he had fought well.

After running into an uppercut from Jesse Brinkley in the quarter finals despite having had the upper hand with his characteristically aggressive boxing style was knocked into a daze, and found himself flat on the canvas. His feud with Ishe continued as they fought in a Fans Favourite Fight on finals night - trying an illegal move on him before going on to lose.

Bonsante fought a rematch with Jesse Brinkley on The Contender Rematch Reality Show. Though the ringside announcers gave the fight to Bonsante, the judges awarded the victory to Brinkley.

After "The Contender"

In July 2006, he was beaten by super middleweight prospect Allan Green on ESPN.

He injected new life in his career on January 12, 2007, with a ten-round unanimous decision win over archrival Matt Vanda for the Minnesota state middleweight title and vacant IBA Americas belt, before a big crowd of 8,872 at the Target Center in Minneapolis. Bonsante dropped Vanda in the tenth on the way to a 98–92, 98–91, 98–91 win.  He lost a technical decision to John Duddy on March 16 at Madison Square Garden, after referee Steve Smoger judged him unable to continue after the ninth round due to a cut from an earlier accidental headbutt.

On July 31, 2008, Bonsante lost a 1st-round KO to Adonis Stevenson when Bonsante was caught with a sharp left just 46 seconds into the first round. Bonsante went down on his back, with his eyes shut. Veteran and WBC appointed referee (Gerry Bolen) began counting but stopped at a count of six as it appeared that Bonsante had been knocked out.  As Bolen was waiving off the fight, Bonsante rapidly got up and appeared to be completely alert. Nonetheless, the referee refused to allow the fight to continue.  ESPN boxing analyst Teddy Atlas commented that Bonsante may have been playing possum by pretending to be knocked out, but miscalculated the referee's reaction.

On January 20, 2009, it was announced that Bonsante would defend his Minnesota middleweight title against challenger Andy Kolle at Grand Casino Hinckley on March 27 of the same year.
Andy Kolle wins by a TKO in round 3 after which Anthony Bonsante announces retirement from the sport.

Notes

External links
 

1970 births
Living people
People from Crosby, Minnesota
American people of Italian descent
Boxers from Minnesota
The Contender (TV series) participants
American male boxers
People from Shakopee, Minnesota
Middleweight boxers